Dymo Corporation is an American manufacturing company of handheld label printers and thermal-transfer printing tape as accessory, embossing tape label makers, and other printers such as CD and DVD labelers and durable medical equipment.

The company is a subsidiary of Newell Brands.

History 

Dymo Industries, Inc. was founded in 1958 to produce handheld tools that use embossing tape. The embossing tape and handheld plastic embossing labeler was invented by David Souza from Oakland, California.

The company was acquired by Esselte in 1978 and battery-powered printers became a major product after 1990. The corporation was sold to Newell Rubbermaid in 2005.

Label sizes 
Following is a list of the label sizes popular for their LabelWriter (400, 450) printer series:

Criticism 
The LabelWriter 550 and 5XL has a RFID reader that reads RFID tags embedded in Dymo genuine label rolls to automatically detect the label type inside. However, this is also to prevent the use of third-party compatible label rolls, a form of digital rights management similar to inkjet printer cartridges and laser printer cartridges containing a chip to prevent the designing and manufacturing of third-party cartridges. Dymo has received criticism for using a razor and blades model by forcing customers to purchase genuine Dymo label rolls.

See also 
 Dymo DiscPainter

References

External links

Computer printers
Packaging machinery
Electronics companies of the United States
Manufacturing companies based in California
Companies based in Berkeley, California
Cold type foundries
American companies established in 1958
Electronics companies established in 1958
Manufacturing companies established in 1958
1958 establishments in California
Newell Brands
1978 mergers and acquisitions
2005 mergers and acquisitions